Epacria or Epakria was one of the twelve districts of ancient Attica, and subsequently, as appears from an inscription, a deme near Plotheia and Halae Araphenides. As the name of a district, it was probably synonymous with Diacria. An ancient grammarian describes the district of Epacria as bordering upon that of the Tetrapolis of Marathon. 

It is located in northeastern Attica.

References

Populated places in ancient Attica
Former populated places in Greece
Demoi